The Village at Medford Center, formerly known as The Medford Center, is a regional shopping center in east Medford, Oregon, United States. The  mall is the oldest and one of the largest in Jackson County, alongside Rogue Valley Mall.

History 
Before the complex was constructed, the land was used for agricultural and for the grazing of livestock, with The Village at Medford Center opening as The Medford Center in 1959, as one of the first shopping centers in Medford located adjacent to Interstate 5. Sears has been the anchor tenant since the opening of The Medford Center until it closed in 2019. Originally, the shopping center had  of retail space and was an outdoor strip mall until it was converted into an enclosed shopping center after renovations in 1984. Several stores were added to the center in the 1980s, which included Payless Drug Stores and Safeway, which added  to the complex. Before the Rogue Valley Mall opened in 1986, it was the largest shopping mall in Medford. The largest movie theater in southern Oregon, Cinemark Tinseltown USA, opened at the center in 1997, replacing the Cine' 4 theater in north Medford and the Movies 5 theater at Rogue Valley Mall which was also operated by Cinemark. In 2016, LBG Real Estate Companies acquired the shopping center and began renovating it, renaming it The Village at Medford Center. New tenants were added to the shopping center, which included a new Department of Motor Vehicles, Willamette Valley Bank, World of Insurance, among others. In addition, a sign titled “The Village” was placed over The Medford Center sign, replacing the Tinseltown logo to reflect the name change of the complex. Main tenants include Cinemark Tinseltown USA, Tap and Vine at 559, Village Fitness, Rite Aid and Red Robin, Burlington, TJ Maxx, and Ross Dress for Less. Former tenants include Sears, Ashley Furniture, and Ralph's.

On December 28, 2018, it was announced that Sears would be closing as part of a plan to close 80 stores nationwide. The store closed in March 2019  and as a result of ongoing development work it has been replaced by Burlington and TJ Maxx which are both now open for business, along with Ross Dress for Less located in the adjacent unit.

See also 
List of shopping malls in Oregon

References

External links 
The Village at Medford Center – Official website
The Medford Center – Real Estate Companies, LLC

Buildings and structures in Medford, Oregon
Shopping malls in Oregon
Tourist attractions in Jackson County, Oregon
1959 establishments in Oregon
Shopping malls established in 1959